is a railway station in the city of  Toyohashi, Aichi Prefecture, Japan, operated by the Public–private partnership Toyohashi Railroad.

Lines
Ueta Station is a station of the Atsumi Line, and is located 6.3 kilometers from the starting point of the line at Shin-Toyohashi Station.

Station layout
The station has two opposed side platforms connected by a level crossing. The station is unattended.

Adjacent stations

|-
!colspan=5|Toyohashi Railroad

Station history
Ueta Station was established on January 22, 1924 as a station on the privately held Atsumi Railroad. The Atsumi Railroad was merged into the Nagoya Railroad on September 1, 1940, but was spun out as the Toyohashi Railroad on October 1, 1954.

Passenger statistics
In fiscal 2017, the station was used by an average of 671 passengers daily.

Surrounding area
Ueta Elementar School
Ueta Junior High school

See also
 List of railway stations in Japan

References

External links

Toyohashi Railway Official home page

Railway stations in Aichi Prefecture
Railway stations in Japan opened in 1924
Toyohashi